Homer Adkins may refer to:

 Homer Martin Adkins (1890–1964), Governor of Arkansas 
 Homer Burton Adkins (1892–1949), American chemist